John Kirkham may refer to:

Association football
 John B. Kirkham (1869–1930), English professional footballer
 John Kirkham (footballer, born 1918) (1918–1982), English professional footballer
 John Kirkham (footballer, born 1941) (1941–2021), English professional footballer

Others

 John Kirkham (1472-1529) of Blagdon, Sheriff of Devon
 John Kirkham (adventurer) (died 1876), British adventurer, hotelier and ship's steward
 John Kirkham (bishop) (1935-2019), Anglican Bishop of Sherborne